In the Russian Empire, snokhachestvo referred to sexual relations between a pater familias (bolshak) of a Russian peasant household (dvor) and his daughter-in-law (snokha) during the minority or absence of his son.

With a view to attracting additional workers to the household, marriages in rural Russia were frequently contracted when the groom was six or seven years old. During her husband's minority, the bride often had to tolerate advances of her assertive father-in-law. For example, in the middle of the 19th century in Tambov Governorate 12-13 year old boys were often married to 16-17 year old girls. The boys' fathers used to arrange such marriages to take advantage of their sons' lack of experience. Snokhachestvo entailed conflicts in the family and put moral pressure on the mother-in-law, who usually treated her son's wife as a rival for her own husband's affections.

Snokachestvo was considered incestuous by the Russian Orthodox Church and unseemly by the obshchina, the rural community. Legally it was considered a form of rape and was punished with fifteen to twenty lashes. Understandably, cases of snokhachestvo were not publicized and the crime remained latent, making it difficult to assess its true extent in the Russian Empire.

One of the first Russian writers to decry snokhachestvo, describing it as a form of "sexual debasement," was Alexander Radishchev, who saw it as an outgrowth of Russian serfdom. In the 19th century, its resurgence was fueled by obligatory conscription and "the seasonal departure of young men for work outside the village."

Snokhachestvo remained relatively widespread even after the abolition of serfdom in 1861. Vladimir Dmitrievich Nabokov, a jurist, resented the fact that "nowhere it seems, except Russia, has at least one form of incest assumed the character of an almost normal everyday occurrence, designated by the appropriate technical term." The Narodnik writer Gleb Uspensky, while deploring the plight of young peasant women, sympathized with "the emotional and physical needs of the mature peasant man."

Snokhachestvo in the arts

There are sexual connotations in the relationship between Katerina and her father-in-law in Shostakovich's 1934 opera Lady Macbeth of the Mtsensk District, but not in the 1865 story it is based upon.

In 1927, Olga Preobrazhenskaia, "the leading woman director of  fiction films in the twenties," and her co-director, Ivan Pravov, released a film condemning snokhachestvo.  Titled The Peasant Women of Ryazan (in Russian, Baby ryazanskie), the silent film is about the rape and pregnancy of a woman whose husband is away in World War I. The rapist is her father-in-law, and the woman, overcome by shame, drowns herself when her husband returns from battle.

References

External links
 

History of human sexuality
Incest
Marriage, unions and partnerships in Russia
Russian words and phrases
Sexual fidelity
Society of the Russian Empire
Violence against women in Russia
Affinity (law)